Semi Permanent is a creative experience company, best known for hosting annual design festivals. Semi Permanent provides creative and production services via SP Studio and SP Productions. Semi Permanent produces innovative creative experiences for clients, including Google, Dropbox and National Geographic.

The first Semi Permanent event was hosted in Sydney, Australia in 2003. Semi Permanent host events throughout Australia and New Zealand, as well as international events in the United States, United Kingdom and China. Semi Permanent curate and host new events throughout the world each year.

Some of the executive attendants of the event have been Industrial Light & Magic, Ed Templeton, Wieden+Kennedy, Shepard Fairey, Jeffrey Deitch, Paula Scher, Oliver Stone, Radiohead and Paul Pope.

In 2020 Semi Permanent announced their partnership with digital publisher Highsnobiety.

Since 2013 Semi Permanent has been part of the Vivid Ideas calendar. Previous Semi Permanent festival line-ups have included presentations from Fancesco Zizola, Brian Roettinger, Numskull, and many more.

Background
Founded in 2002 by Murray Bell and Andrew Johnstone, Semi Permanent encompasses three core business pillars: Semi Permanent, SP Brand Studio and SP Productions.

The Semi Permanent office is located in Sydney, Australia.

Semi Permanent is the company's namesake brand, encompassing a global design festival, annual book, website and more. Semi Permanent have been running creativity festivals since 2003 in cities across the globe, including Sydney, Auckland, Singapore, Abu Dhabi, London, New York, Los Angeles, Hong Kong and Portugal. Past speakers and collaborators include iconic filmmakers Oliver Stone, Michel Gondry, and the Coppola family; artists Tom Sachs, CJ Hendry and Alex Israel; and the world’s most renowned creatives including Nike’s Tinker Hatfield, Pentagram’s Paula Scher, Pro Skater Tony Hawk, architect Bjarke Ingels and many more. Previous festivals have included the collaborations with Google Tilt Brush and National Geographic. Previous festival themes include "Truth" in 2019, and "Restless" in 2020.

Semi Permanent publishes an annual book, featuring interviews with creative thought leaders. Previously featured interviews, conversations and work include talent such as Alicia Keys, Cara Stricker, Takashi Murakami, Nadia Lee Cohen and Kevin Parker.

SP Brand Studio co-created a two-day live sport & creativity experience in 2021, and created an immersive retrospective with Stanley Donwood and Radiohead with a bespoke soundscape by Thom Yorke.

SP Productions is Semi Permanents 'white label' events and production agency.

SP Productions worked with Google to curate, program and produce their global diversity and inclusion program, Rare.

Past speakers and collaborators (selection)

Radiohead
Roman Coppola
Alicia Keys
Jeffrey Deitch
Kevin Parker, Tame Impala
Takashi Murakami
Olivier Zahm (Purple)
 Michael Leon
Nicholas Felton
kelly Slater
Gia Coppola
Carl Lewis
Oliver Stone
Chris Burkard
Shaun White
Carli Lloyd
PAM
Willo Perron
 Vince Frost
Platon
Danny Yount
Scott Dadich (Wired)
United Visual Artists
Wieden+Kennedy
Jonathan Zawada
Cory Arnold
The Monkeys
Industrial Light & Magic
Banksy
Seb Lester
The Talks
Jeff Soto
Fafi
Michael Muller
Jill Greenberg
Ron English
Droga 5
Kris Moyes
Nabil
Paul Pope
Floria Sigismondi
WETA Digital
Taj Burrow
Shepard Fairey
March Studio
AKQA
R/GA
Tara McPherson
Moving Picture Company (MPC)
Aaron Rose
Ed Templeton
Reg Mombassa
Pixar
Stefan Sagmeister

References

Design events